Eurico Tomás de Lima (Ponta Delgada, Açores,  - Maia) was a Portuguese pianist, composer and pedagogue.

Life
Eurico Tomás de Lima was the son of António Tomás de Lima, a violinist, composer, conductor and professor at the National Conservatory in Lisbon. He also studied at the National Conservatory, from 1921 to 1929. He studied piano with Alexandre Rey Colaço and José Viana da Mota, aesthetics and music history with Luís de Freitas Branco, and composition with Hermínio do Nascimento. In 1929 he finished the Virtuosity degree, graduating summa cum laude ("Distinção e Louvor").

In 1932 he presented for the first time a solo piano recital playing only his own compositions. Apart from his own works, his preferences in piano music lean towards "Beethoven, Chopin, Liszt and all of the masters of the slavic school."

In 1940 and 1941 he took part in the Cultural Missions of the Secretariat for National Propaganda, at the invitation of the minister António Ferro. In these chamber music recitals throughout the country, he collaborated with cellist Madalena Moreira de Sá e Costa, violinist Paulo Manso and soprano Leonor Bívar Viana da Mota. Also in 1941, he was awarded a composition prize from National Radio (Emissora Nacional de Radiodifusão): the First Prize - Golden Poppy, in the Flower Games (Jogos Florais) competition.

In 1949, and again 1952, he toured Brazil to great acclaim.

Between 1956 and 1973 he regularly recorded piano recitals for Emissora Nacional, playing mainly his own works. However, he also gave special attention to Portuguese piano music, as seen in a recital, recorded in 1970, devoted in its entirety to works by Óscar da Silva (1870–1958), a Portuguese pianist and composer who studied in Germany with Carl Reinecke and Clara Schumann. Eurico Tomás de Lima had met Óscar da Silva in childhood, and reconnected with him in São Paulo, on the occasion of his first tour in Brazil. "Tomás de Lima advised [Óscar da Silva] to return to Porto and offered his house to stay, so that his situation wouldn't be a repeat of the fate of Marcos Portugal: it took a hundred years after his death for his remains to return to the motherland!"

Eurico Tomás de Lima was also active as a piano pedagogue. He taught at the following schools: Academia de Amadores de Música (Lisbon), Academia Mozart (Porto), Academia Beethoven (Porto), Academia Parnaso (Porto), Academia de Música e Belas-Artes da Ilha da Madeira, Conservatório Calouste Gulbenkian de Braga. The composer is side by side with the pedagogue, as a large part of Eurico Tomás de Lima's piano compositions (especially his four-hands and two-pianos repertoire) was written for his students. As a testimony of the reach of his didactic works: the Portuguese pianist Artur Pizarro, in his first public appearance in 1971,  played a piece by Eurico Tomás de Lima.

Works for Solo Piano 
Eurico Tomás de Lima has a substantial catalogue of compositions for solo piano, one of the largest of Portuguese twentieth century. The only Portuguese composers with more works for piano solo are Fernando Lopes Graça, Óscar da Silva and António Victorino d'Almeida.
Eurico Tomás de Lima was always very methodical in writing and cataloguing his works: he always wrote down in his manuscripts the place and date of his compositions.

Recordings

 Canções. Canção sem Palavras. Sonatina No. 2. Sara Braga Simões, soprano and Luís Pipa, piano. Câmara Municipal da Maia, 2008.

This CD contains Eurico Tomás de Lima's complete works for voice and piano, paired with two solo piano works: Canção sem palavras e Sonatina n.º 2.

 Canção sem palavras
 Por tuas próprias mãos
 Este lenço em que chorei
 És tu!
 Dorme, dorme, meu menino
 Triste cantiga de amor
 Balada dos olhos verdes
 Canção da vida e da morte
 Mors-Amor
 Duas canções para canto e piano: Com calma e docemente - Vivo
 Duas canções para canto e piano: Moderato
 Brasil
 Trovas satíricas
 Ó ribeira, ribeirinha
 Senhora quintaneira
 Marianita
 Vira
 Sonatina n.º 2: I. Allegro deciso
 Sonatina n.º 2: II. Pastoral - Andante
 Sonatina n.º 2: III. Vira - Vivo

Saber Ouvir - Eurico Thomaz de Lima (1908–1989), Vol. 1. João Lima, piano. Numérica, 2010. NUM1210.

"The current CD  has chosen to include a diverse group of works for piano, which will allow the general public to witness the progressive evolution of the composer's oeuvre throughout nearly forty years of productivity."

 Estudo
 Prelúdio
 Nocturno
 Fantasia
 Dança Negra n.º 1
 Dança Negra n.º 2
 Dança Negra n.º 3
 Dança Negra n.º 4
 Buchenwald - Protesto Musical
 Suite Portuguesa n.º 1: Vira
 Suite Portuguesa n.º 1: Coral Alentejano
 Suite Portuguesa n.º 1: Fandango
 Suite Portuguesa no. 2: Prelúdio
 Suite Portuguesa no. 2: Burlesca
 Suite Portuguesa no. 2: Fandango
 Barcarola

Música Portuguesa para piano, vol. 3. Nancy Lee Harper, piano. Numérica, 2012. NUM1228.
"This CD is the third of a series of recordings of Portuguese Piano Music that I have researched and made since 1999. This particular volume is produced to accompany my own book PORTUGUESE PIANO MUSIC: AN INTRODUCTION AND ANNOTATED BIBLIOGRAPHY (Scarecrow Press, USA, 2012). [...] The main objective here is to bring a wide variety of styles and composers to the listener in order to show the richness of the pianistic repertoire of Portugal, including didactic piano music."

This CD contains a vast collection of Portuguese piano music, including Eurico Tomás de Lima's Valsa Caprichosa, no. 25 from Gradual.

Saber Ouvir - Eurico Tomás de Lima (1908–1989), Vol. 2. Miguel Campinho, piano. Numérica, 2013. NUM1249.

This double CD contains the complete solo piano sonatas e sonatinas of Eurico Tomás de Lima.

CD1
 Sonata n.º 1, in C-sharp Minor: I. Allegro Maestoso
 Sonata n.º 1, in C-sharp Minor: II. Andante sostenuto ed molto doloroso
 Sonata n.º 1, in C-sharp Minor: III. Finale. Allegro con fuoco
 Sonata n.º 2, in E Minor: I. Allegro appassionato
 Sonata n.º 2, in E Minor: II. Scherzo. Allegro deciso - Molto piu lento - Tempo primo
 Sonata n.º 2, in E Minor: III. Andante cantabile
 Sonata n.º 2, in E Minor: IV. Finale. Allegro impetuoso
 Sonatina n.º 1, in A Major: I. Allegro moderato
 Sonatina n.º 1, in A Major: II. Andante
 Sonatina n.º 1, in A Major: III. Allegro assai
 Algarve (Suite for Piano): I. Aben-Afan
 Algarve (Suite for Piano): II. Praia da Rocha
 Algarve (Suite for Piano): III. D. Paio Péres Correia	
 Algarve (Suite for Piano): IV. Ponta da Piedade
 Algarve (Suite for Piano): V. Olhão, Vila Cubista
 Algarve (Suite for Piano): VI. Jardins de Estói
 Algarve (Suite for Piano): VII. Bailarico
 Algarve (Suite for Piano): VIII. Sagres

CD2
 Sonata n.º 3, in A minor: I. Allegro risoluto
 Sonata n.º 3, in A minor: II. Andante
 Sonata n.º 3, in A minor: III. Vivo
 Sonatina n.º 2, in C Major: I. Allegro deciso
 Sonatina n.º 2, in C Major: II. Pastoral - Andante
 Sonatina n.º 2, in C Major: III. Vira - Vivo
 Sonata n.º 4, in F Major: I. Allegro giocoso
 Sonata n.º 4, in F Major: II. Andante
 Sonata n.º 4, in F Major: III. Vivace
 Ilha do Paraíso (Suite in six tableaux): I. Nossa Senhora do Monte
 Ilha do Paraíso (Suite in six tableaux): II. Funchal ao Luar
 Ilha do Paraíso (Suite in six tableaux): III. Penha d’Águia
 Ilha do Paraíso (Suite in six tableaux): IV. Ribeiro Frio
 Ilha do Paraíso (Suite in six tableaux): V. “Bailhos” Cruzados
 Ilha do Paraíso (Suite in six tableaux): VI. Cabo Girão

References

External links
Eurico Thomaz de Lima Documental Center - University of Minho

1908 births
1989 deaths
Portuguese pianists
Portuguese composers
Portuguese male composers
Portuguese music people
Portuguese musicians
20th-century pianists
20th-century composers
Male pianists
20th-century male musicians